Iberochondrostoma is a genus of cyprinid fish endemic to the Iberian Peninsula.

Species
There are currently five recognized species in this genus:
 Iberochondrostoma almacai (M. M. Coelho, Mesquita & Collares-Pereira, 2005)
 Iberochondrostoma lemmingii (Steindachner, 1866)
 Iberochondrostoma lusitanicum (Collares-Pereira, 1980) (Boga-portugesa)
 Iberochondrostoma olisiponensis (Gante, C. D. Santos & Alves, 2007) (Lisbon arched-mouth nase)
 Iberochondrostoma oretanum (Doadrio & Carmona, 2003)

References

 
Ray-finned fish genera
Cyprinid fish of Europe